David Reuben may refer to:

 David and Simon Reuben, British businessmen and philanthropists
 David Reuben (author) (born 1933), California psychiatrist, sex expert and author